Krasny is an urban locality (an urban-type settlement) and the administrative center of Krasninsky District of Smolensk Oblast, Russia, located at the confluence of the Svinaya and the Mereyka Rivers  southwest of Smolensk. Population:

History
Krasny (originally Krasn or Krasen) is first mentioned in 1165 by the Hypatian Codex, when Davyd Rostislavich, Prince of Smolensk, gave Krasen to his nephew, Roman of Vitebsk. Between second half of the 14th century and the middle of the 17th century, the area belonged intermittently to the Grand Duchy of Lithuania, to Poland, and to the Grand Duchy of Moscow. Since 1654, it was finally transferred to the Tsardom of Russia.

In the course of the administrative reform carried out in 1708 by Peter the Great, the area was included into Smolensk Governorate and remained there until 1929, with the exception of the brief period between 1775 and 1796, when Smolensk Governorate was transformed into Smolensk Viceroyalty. The area belonged to Krasninsky Uyezd, which was established in 1775. In 1776, Krasny was granted town status. In 1796, the uyezd was abolished but it was re-established in 1802.

During the French invasion of Russia, Krasny played an important role, since the French army passed it twice en route to and from Russia. The battle in August 1812 was a lesser action of Murat's advance guard against the small retreating Russian rearguard of Dmitry Neverovsky.  The French ran into unexpectedly strong resistance from the Russians. In his Napoleonic history, de Ségur wrote that Neverovsky retreated "like a lion".

At the Battle of Krasnoi in November 1812, the Russian army inflicted heavy losses on the remnants of the French Grande Armée.  There are two monuments in Krasny commemorating that event, both erected in 1912.

On 12 July 1929, governorates and uyezds were abolished, and Krasninsky District with the administrative center in Krasny was established. Krasny did not retain the town status during Soviet times. The district belonged to Smolensk Okrug of Western Oblast. On August 1, 1930 the okrugs were abolished, and the districts were subordinated directly to the oblast. On 27 September 1937 Western Oblast was abolished and split between Oryol and Smolensk Oblasts. Krasninsky District was transferred to Smolensk Oblast. Between 1941 and 1943, during WWII, Krasny was occupied by German troops. On 1 February 1963, during the abortive Khrushchyov administrative reform, Krasninsky District was merged into Smolensky District, but in 1965 it was re-established.

Climate
Krasny has a warm-summer humid continental climate (Dfb in the Köppen climate classification).

<div style="width:70%;">

Economy
Industry includes flax and dairy processing, vegetable processing, and manufacture of drainage pipes.

Transportation
Krasny has access to M1 "Belarus" Highway and is additionally connected by paved roads with Smolensk and with Orsha (so called Old Smolensk Road).

Culture and recreation
In Krasny, there is a museum of local lore, whose three exhibits include materials on the Patriotic War of 1812, Great Patriotic War of 1941–1945, and on modern life at the settlement.

On September 27, 2009, the "Walk of Heroes" history museum opened in Krasny.

References

Notes

Sources

Urban-type settlements in Smolensk Oblast
Smolensk Voivodeship
Krasninsky Uyezd